Orange River Mudfish (Labeo capensis) is a species of fish in genus Labeo. It inhabits the Orange River system of southern Africa.

Size 
L.Capensis reaches a maximum length of 500mm and the SA angling record is 3.83kg

Biology & Ecology 
Occurs in a variety of habitats: quiet well vegetated backwaters, standing open waters, flowing open waters, sandy-rocky stretches and rocky rapids. Their preferred habitat is flowing rocky channels. Bottom feeder which grazes algae and organic detritus

Breeds in summer, gathering in large numbers in shallow rocky rapids where eggs are laid. Larvae hatch after 3 or 4 days. May live up to 8 or 9 years

Range 
Africa: within the drainage basin of the Orange-Vaal River system to which it is possibly restricted. Introduced to the Fish River system in Eastern Cape.

Uses 
Occasional angling species, also used in physiological and ecological research and is a potential commercial species.

References
https://www.fishbase.se/summary/5129

 

Labeo
Freshwater fish of South Africa
Taxa named by Andrew Smith (zoologist)
Fish described in 1841